Ariel Ramos (born April 14, 1971) is a retired male wrestler from Cuba, who competed in the freestyle competition during his career. He won a bronze medal at the 1995 Pan American Games for his native country, and competed at the 1996 Summer Olympics in Atlanta, Georgia. There he was defeated in the final round by Les Gutches from the United States.

References

External links
 

1971 births
Living people
Olympic wrestlers of Cuba
Wrestlers at the 1996 Summer Olympics
Cuban male sport wrestlers
Sportspeople from Havana
Pan American Games bronze medalists for Cuba
Pan American Games medalists in wrestling
Wrestlers at the 1995 Pan American Games
Medalists at the 1995 Pan American Games
20th-century Cuban people
21st-century Cuban people